Ictidognathus is an extinct genus of therocephalian therapsids that lived in South Africa during the Late Permian. Fossils are found in the Tropidostoma and Cistecephalus Assemblage Zones of the Beaufort Group in the Western Cape.

See also 
 List of therapsids

References

External links 
 The main groups of non-mammalian synapsids at Mikko's Phylogeny Archive

Baurioids
Therocephalia genera
Lopingian genus first appearances
Lopingian genus extinctions
Lopingian synapsids of Africa
Permian South Africa
Fossils of South Africa
Fossil taxa described in 1911
Taxa named by Robert Broom